Ángel González Crego (born 28 September 1964) is a Spanish football manager.

External links
 

1964 births
Living people
Sportspeople from Salamanca
Spanish football managers
UD Salamanca managers
CD Castellón managers
CD Guijuelo managers
20th-century Spanish people
21st-century Spanish people